William Watson Dempsey (10 September 1896 – 1967) was an English professional footballer who played in the Football League for Norwich City as an inside forward and left back.

Career statistics

References 

English footballers
Brentford F.C. players
English Football League players
1896 births
1967 deaths
Association football inside forwards
Association football fullbacks
People from St Germans, Cornwall
Portland United F.C. players
Ipswich Town F.C. players
Norwich City F.C. players
Queens Park Rangers F.C. players
Tunbridge Wells F.C. players
Grays Thurrock United F.C. players
Weymouth F.C. players
Western Football League players